Joshua Christopher Daniels (born Joshua Christopher Tracey on 22 February 1996) is an Irish professional footballer who is a  winger/wing-back for Cymru Premier side The New Saints.

Club career
Born in Derry, began his career with Derry City. He scored his first goal for the club in May 2016, less than two months after five members of his family had died in a car accident. In August 2017 he moved to Glenavon, signing a contract extension with the club in January 2019, lasting until 2021.

In July 2020 he was linked with a move away from Glenavon, with Glentoran and Linfield reportedly interested. In August 2020 he signed for English club Shrewsbury Town. He made his competitive debut for Shrewsbury as a substitute in a 4–3 defeat to Middlesbrough in the EFL Cup on 4 September 2020.

In June 2022 he joined The New Saints.

International career
Daniels played for Northern Ireland at under-17 and under-19. He then switched allegiance to the Republic of Ireland, playing for their under-21 team.

Personal life
In March 2016, five members of Daniels' family died in the Buncrana Pier tragedy when a car plunged into Lough Swilly in County Donegal, Ireland.

Career statistics

References

1997 births
Living people
Sportspeople from Derry (city)
Association footballers from Northern Ireland
Republic of Ireland association footballers
Derry City F.C. players
Glenavon F.C. players
Shrewsbury Town F.C. players
League of Ireland players
NIFL Premiership players
Association football wingers
Northern Ireland youth international footballers
Republic of Ireland under-21 international footballers
English Football League players
The New Saints F.C. players